Goth Dulla Lakhan is a village in Sukkur District, Sindh, Pakistan, it is located at 28° 6' 0" North, 69° 22' 0" East near  to the border of Punjab.

References

Villages in Sindh
Sukkur District